was a town located in Kamo District, Hiroshima Prefecture, Japan.

As of 2003, the town had an estimated population of 7,262 and a density of 59.58 persons per km². The total area was 121.88 km².

On March 22, 2005, Daiwa, along with the town of Kui (from Mitsugi District), and the town of Hongō (from Toyota District), was merged into the expanded city of Mihara and no longer exists as an independent municipality.

External links
 Mihara official website 

Dissolved municipalities of Hiroshima Prefecture